The 1967 Cork Junior Football Championship was the 69th staging of the Cork Junior A Football Championship since its establishment by Cork County Board in 1895. The championship began on 15 October 1967 but was not completed until 10 March 1967 due to an outbreak of foot and mouth disease.

The final was played on 10 March 1968 at the Athletic Grounds in Cork, between Newcestown and Midleton, in what was their first ever meeting in the final. Newcestown won the match by 2-12 to 1-02 to claim their first ever championship title.

Qualification

Results

Quarter-finals

Semi-finals

Final

Championship statistics

Miscellaneous

 The semi-final replay between Midleton and Castletownbere was called off by the referee nine minutes into the second half when a player who had been sent off returned to the field of play and refused to leave. The match was later awarded to Midleton.

References

1967 in Irish sport
Cork Junior Football Championship